Grigore George Tocilescu (26 October 1850 – 18 September 1909) was a Romanian historian, archaeologist, epigrapher and folkorist, member of Romanian Academy.

He was a professor of ancient history at the University of Bucharest, author of Marele Dicționar Geografic al României (The Great Geographical Dictionary of Romania), general secretary of the Romanian Ministry of Teaching and multiple times senator, with conservative political views. Tocilescu is one of the first Romanian historians who focused on the study of civilizations in ancient Dacia. As a folklorist he collaborated on the publication of a folkloristics compendium.

Life

Education 
After finishing the primary and secondary school Ploieşti, Tocilescu went to Bucharest where he graduated at the Saint Sava National College. He then studied in universities in Prague and Vienna, where he obtained the Doctor of Philosophy title and the license to practice law. Back in Romania, in 1881 he became professor of ancient history and epigraphy at the University of Bucharest.

Involvement 
In 1884 the Archaeological Seminary's Library was established through Professor Tocilescu's grant.

At the death of Romanian historian, Romantic author, academic and politician Vasile Alexandrescu Urechia, November 21, 1901, Tocilescu delivered the funeral oration.

Professional activity 

In 1877 Tocilescu went to Moscow, to the Rumyantsev Museum, where he copied the book From the Beginning of the First World (De-nceputul lumiei de-ntâiu), written by Mihail Moxa, and sent the copy to Bogdan Petriceicu Hasdeu, who published it in Cuvente den batrâni ( vol. I, 1878). The work is a universal history that begins with the "creation of the world", speaks of the Assyrians, Egyptians, Persians, then passes to the Romans. It makes a brief history of the Roman Republic, after which it lists the emperors of the West and the East until the establishment of the Turkish rule in Europe and ends with the first battles of the Turks with the Romanians in 1489. Later, he left for Paris to continue his studies in the French archives and libraries, about Dimitrie Cantemir. On this occasion he attended courses at the Collège de France and the École Pratique de Hautes-Etudes (Sorbonne).

Returning to the country, he was appointed the director of the National Museum of Antiquities and held the position of professor of ancient history and epigraphy at the University of Bucharest (1881). From the point of view of archaeology, Tocilescu was the initiator of the Romanian archaeological excavations in Dobrogea.
He is co-author of the work The Great Geographical Dictionary of Romania published in 5 volumes in Bucharest between 1898-1902. He was general secretary at the Ministry of Education and, several times, conservative senator. Tocilescu is one of the first historians to study the civilizations on the territory of the former Dacia. He left three impressive works: Dacia before the Romans (Dacia înainte de romani), the Adamclisi Monument (Monumentul de la Adamclisi) in collaboration with O. Benndorf and G. Niemann and Fouilles et recherches archéologiques en Roumanie.

He was also concerned with the republishing of some fundamental works, such as The Chronicle of the Antiquity of the Romanian-Moldavian-Vlachs (Hronicul vechimei a româno-moldo-vlahilor) (Ed. Academiei, 1901) by Dimitrie Cantemir.

Bibliography 
 Cumu se scrie la noi istoria (How the history gets written in our lands), Bucharest, 1873
 Dacia înainte the Romani (Dacia before the Romans), Bucharest, 1880 - One of the first history books on the Pre-Roman Dacian subject
 Manual de istoria româna: pentru școlele secundare de ambe-sexe, Bucuresci, Lito-Tipografia Carol Göbl, 1894
 Marele Dicționar Geografic al României (The Great Geographical Dictionary of Romania), Bucharest, 1898-1902, 5 volumes
 Materialuri Folkloristice, Bucharest, 1900
 Balade și doine, (prefață Marin Bucur), București, Editura Tineretului, 1958

Reissue 
 534 Slavo-Romanian historical documents from Wallachia and Moldova, regarding the connections with Transylvania (1346-1603) from the archives of Brașov and Bistrita in original Slavic text accompanied by Romanian translation, printed in Vienna in 1905-1906 in Adolf Holzhausen Workshops, Sep 28, 1909, reprinted "Casa Românească" Bookstore, 1931
 History of the Romanians, (re-edition) Tipo Moldova Publishing House, 2010
 Ballads and doines (reissue), Miracol Publishing House, 2010; Dacia XXI Publishing House, Cluj-Napoca, 2011, .

See also 
 Dacia
 List of Romanian archaeologists

Notes

External links

 
 Materialuri Folkloristice, Bucharest, 1900
 Grigore Tocilescu on Romanian Wikisource
 Grigore Tocilescu High School in Mizil, Romania

People from Mizil
Romanian archaeologists
19th-century Romanian historians
Romanian writers
Romanian folklorists
Epigraphers
Titular members of the Romanian Academy
Academic staff of the University of Bucharest
1850 births
1909 deaths
Historiography of Dacia